Long Ke Wan is a bay in Sai Kung District, Hong Kong.

Geography
Long Ke Wan is located in the southeastern part of Sai Kung Peninsula, north of the East Dam of High Island Reservoir, and within the Sai Kung East Country Park.

Village
Long Ke is a village located on the northwestern shore of the bay. It is a recognized village under the New Territories Small House Policy.

Features
The Nativity of Our Lady Chapel, one of the historic churches of Sai Kung Peninsula, is located in Long Ke. It was built in 1918.

Access
Long Ke Wan is located at the end of stage 1 and the start of stage 2 of the MacLehose Trail.

See also
 Beaches of Hong Kong
 List of bays in Hong Kong

References

Bays of Hong Kong
Beaches of Hong Kong
Sai Kung Peninsula
Sai Kung District